The 1958 Northeastern State Redmen football team represented Northeastern State University as a member of the Oklahoma Collegiate Conference (OCC) during the 1958 NAIA football season. In their third season under head coach Harold "Tuffy" Stratton, the Redmen compiled a perfect 11–0 record (6–0 against OCC opponents) and won the OCC championship. In the post-season, they defeated  in the NAIA playoffs and Arizona State–Flagstaff in the Holiday Bowl to win the NAIA national championship.

Guard Claude Billingsley won NAIA All-America honors. He was also named the outstanding lineman of 1958 in the OCC. Halfback Dan Smith led the OCC in scoring and was named the OCC's outstanding back of 1958. Seven Northeastern State players received first-team honors on the 1958 All-Oklahoma Collegiate Conference teams selected by the seven conference coaches: Billingsley; Smith (unanimous choice); quarterback Frankie Phelps (unanimous choice); end Charles Moore; tackle Joe Kiger; center Lynn Burris; and fullback Deloyd Reed. Three others received second-team honors: end Fred Hood; tackle James Barrett; and guard Roger Wickersham.

The team played its home games at Gable Field in Tahlequah, Oklahoma.

Schedule

References

Northeastern State
Northeastern State RiverHawks football seasons
NAIA Football National Champions
College football undefeated seasons
Northeastern State Redmen football